Ilona Mihályka (née Samus, born 20 June 1951 in Budapest) is a former Hungarian handball and two times World Championship bronze medalist. In 1980 she was also member of the Hungarian team which finished fourth in the Olympic Games. She played in three matches of the tournament.

References

External links

1951 births
Living people
Handball players from Budapest
Hungarian female handball players
Olympic handball players of Hungary
Handball players at the 1980 Summer Olympics
20th-century Hungarian women
21st-century Hungarian women